A pallet rack safety bolt is a pallet racking  accessory commonly found on used pallet shelving systems. These steel bolts are manufactured to replace lost or damaged pallet rack cross beam locking devices.

Pallet Rack Safety Bolt Design

Material: Steel with Bright Zinc Plated Coating

Measurements: Height -  inches high from top to bottom, Top Hat - Diameter  inch, Width - Diameter 0.3 inches, Angle - between 91 & 89 degree bend at the top of pin

Pallet Rack Safety Bolt Installation

The pallet rack safety bolt is installed by pushing the pin through two aligning accessory holes in the pallet rack cross beam and pallet rack upright frame. The top hat or three-quarter circle at the top of the pin stops it from going all the way through the hole. The pin has a J design so it is installed horizontally and then turns vertical as it enters the upright frame. Gravity holds the pallet rack safety bolt in place. Estimated 5 seconds to install compared to 30–60 seconds for a standard pallet rack clip.

OSHA ANSI/RMI Beam Locking Device Regulations

What does OSHA say about pallet rack clips? Although OSHA does not get specific on pallet rack requirements for your warehouse, they refer to ANSI which is the Rack Manufacturers Institute Specification for the Design, Testing and Utilization of Industrial Steel Storage Racks. The ANSI document explains the following:5.4.2 Beam Locking Device Except for movable-shelf racks, beams subject to machine loading shall have connection locking devices (or bolts) capable of resisting an upward force of 1,000 pounds (453.6 kg) per connection without failure or disengagement.

Used Pallet Rack Beam Locking Device

Pallet racking is often bought and sold multiple times. Every time the pallet rack is tore down, installed and moved around, the engineered pallet rack safety clips that came with the system are lost, damaged or no longer working. Due to the difficulty of identifying pallet rack those safety clips can be hard to find when searching for the manufacturer who provides them. The pallet rack safety bolt has a universal design made specifically to work with several styles of pallet rack systems including: SpaceRak, Interlake, Ridg-U-Rak Teardrop, USP, Excel Storage Products, Bulldog, Hannibal, Steel King, Wireway, and many others. The key indicator to see if the universal pallet rack pin will work with used rack systems is finding the 2 .30" holes that align in the pallet rack cross beam and upright frame.

Pallet Rack Safety Bolt - Also Known As: Pallet Rack Drop Pin, Pallet Rack J Bolt, Pallet Rack Safety Pin, Universal Pallet Rack Drop Pin, Pallet Rack Pins, J Bolt Pins, Rack Safety Pins, Pallet Rack Beam Locking Device, Cross Beam Pin, Safety Clio, Shelf Clip...

Meets OSHA Recommended ANSI/RMI MH 16.1 Section 5.4.2 requires a locking device that prevents disengagement of the shelf beam when subjected to a 1000 lbs vertical uplift force. It is important that the locking devices be properly installed and remain engaged.

References

Fasteners